Anatoliy Andreyevich Banishevskiy (23 February 1946, in Baku – 10 December 1997, in Baku) was an Azerbaijani footballer. Throughout most of his playing and coaching career, Banishevskiy was committed to his originally domestic club, Neftçi. He is widely considered the greatest Azerbaijani footballer of all time.
He played for the Soviet Union national football team, winning 51 caps and scoring 20 goals. Banishevskiy played for the Soviet side in the 1966 FIFA World Cup, as well as in European Championship 1968 and 1972. His club team was Neftçi, and he scored 136 goals in Soviet Top League competition. The striker was unofficially named Azerbaijan's Player of the Year three times-in 1966, 1967, and 1978.

In November 2003, as part of the celebration of UEFA's Jubilee, he was selected as the Golden Player for Azerbaijan by the Association of Football Federations of Azerbaijan as the country's most outstanding player over the past 50 years.

Early years
Banishevskiy was born in Baku to a family of Ukrainian descent.

He started playing football at the age of 16 and played all of his career for Neftçi, transforming into one of the best Azerbaijani players.

Neftçi 
Upon making the club's senior roster at the age of 16, Banishevskiy immediately emerged into one of the best young talents of his generation. Banishevskiy maintained his status of a premier Azerbaijani player, and remained very influential football figure throughout his entire football profession and beyond.

International career
Banishevskiy made his international debut at 19 years old on 4 July 1965 for USSR against Brazil during a friendly match. His international career ended in final of the 1972 European Championship match loss against West Germany.

Coaching career
After retiring as a player, Banishevskiy briefly coached Neftçi and Automobilist Mingachevir. He has also worked as youth coach of Burkina Faso during 1987–1988 period.

Later life and death

Banishevskiy was diagnosed with diabetic coma in 1991, having survived his first attack in 1987. He suffered cerebral atrophy as result of a second attack, which also caused him memory loss.

Subsequently, following his wife's ill-timed behavior, Banishevskiy lost the ownership of his house, which led him to live a difficult life in alcoholism on the streets of Baku. However, he was rescued from this difficult situation by his old supporter and beloved follower Saida, who cared for him in his last years of his life and ultimately married him.

On 10 December 1997, Banishevskiy died after a third diabetic coma attack, having also suffered pancreatitis.

Personal life
His grandson Ali Babayev Banishevskiy began to play in the youth team of Neftçi in 2011 when he was 15. Currently, Ali plays professional football in Azerbaijan's First Division for Shusha FK.

Honors
The home stadium of FK Masallı football club was renamed to Anatoliy Banishevskiy Stadium in his honor.

Other achievements
 Grigory Fedotov club's member: 38th with 115 goals
 List of the bests 33: 2nd (1965, 1966, 1967)

References

External links
 UEFA.com – Prodigy who kept his promise, Golden player of Azerbaijan

UEFA Golden Players
1946 births
1997 deaths
Soviet footballers
Azerbaijani footballers
Azerbaijani football managers
1966 FIFA World Cup players
UEFA Euro 1968 players
UEFA Euro 1972 players
Soviet Union international footballers
Honoured Masters of Sport of the USSR
Footballers from Baku
Soviet Top League players
Neftçi PFK managers
Azerbaijani expatriate football managers
Expatriate football managers in Burkina Faso
Azerbaijani people of Ukrainian descent
Association football forwards
Neftçi PFK players
Burials at II Alley of Honor